Longwen District is a district of Zhangzhou, Fujian province, People's Republic of China.

Administrative divisions
The only subdistrict is Dongyue Subdistrict

Towns:
Buwen, Lantian, Chaoyang, Guokeng

References

County-level divisions of Fujian
Zhangzhou